Canadian National Railway's Kingston Subdivision, or Kingston Sub for short, is a major railway line connecting Toronto with Montreal that carries the majority of CN traffic between these points. The line was originally the main trunk for the Grand Trunk Railway between these cities, although there has been some realignment of the route between these cities. The majority of the Kingston Sub runs close to the northern bank of Lake Ontario and the Saint Lawrence River.

The infrastructure consists of twin tracks, on which over 50 pieces of interlocking crossover tracks are grafted all along the subdivision. The extra length of these crossover tracks allows for high speed track interchange. Low gravity intermodal container trains are allowed to change tracks at 45 miles per hour, and VIA Rail's passenger trains, at 60, and in some areas, 90. The governing traffic control system is CTC. Since 1995, no OCS operation clearance forms need to be filled by train conductors on the Kingston Subdivision. CTC signals thus provide both permission and authorization for train movements, as is the situation with most main line operation at CN.

Just east of Newcastle, east of Toronto, the line is joined by the CP Belleville Subdivision, Canadian Pacific Railway's similar mainline route. The two remain nearly side-by-side to the east of Belleville, where the Belleville sub turns north to Smiths Falls. Sections of the Kingston Sub are no longer owned by CN. In particular, CN mainline freight traffic in the Toronto area no longer follows the Kingston Sub, and is re-directed north of the city along the York Sub. The section between Pickering Junction and Union Station in downtown Toronto has been sold to Metrolinx for GO Transit service, part of their Lakeshore East line.

Stations
The 1850s Grand Trunk Railway mainline consisted of 34 stations, many of which have been removed from service or no longer exist. Lansdowne station was torn down soon after CN abandoned service to the village in 1966; CN demolished an Iroquois station in 2002.

Stations currently on the Toronto-Montréal mainline include:
 Union Station (Toronto)
 GO Transit (no VIA service) at Danforth, Scarborough, Eglinton in Toronto
 Guildwood
 Commuter stations in Rouge Hill/Pickering, Ajax and Whitby serve GO Transit; No VIA service
 Oshawa GO Station
 Port Hope railway station
 Cobourg railway station
 Brighton (not in use, now part of Memory Junction railway museum)
 Trenton Junction railway station
 Belleville station (Ontario)
 Napanee railway station
 Ernestown (not in use)
 Kingston railway station (Ontario)
 Kingston Outer Station (abandoned, in ruins)
 Gananoque railway station
 Brockville railway station
 Prescott (not in use, now houses Grenville historical society and archives)
 Near Morrisburg, two historic stations from The Lost Villages were relocated but did not return to service. New stations were built in Morrisburg and Long Sault in the 1950s but the train no longer stops.
 Cornwall railway station
 Dorval railway station (Via)
 The line ended at Bonaventure Station, which has been replaced by Montreal Central Station.

References

Kingston Subdivision
Kingston Subdivision
Railway lines in Toronto
Transport in Montreal
Rail infrastructure in the Regional Municipality of Durham
Rail infrastructure in Quebec
Rail transport in Pickering, Ontario
Rail transport in Ajax, Ontario
Rail transport in Whitby, Ontario
Rail transport in Oshawa
Transport in Clarington
Rail transport in Northumberland County, Ontario
Rail transport in Cobourg
Transport in Quinte West
Rail transport in Hastings County
Tyendinaga Mohawk Territory
Rail transport in Belleville, Ontario
Rail transport in Lennox and Addington County
Rail transport in Kingston, Ontario
Rail infrastructure in Leeds and Grenville United Counties
Rail transport in Brockville
Rail transport in the United Counties of Stormont, Dundas and Glengarry
Rail transport in Cornwall, Ontario